Icariotis is a genus of beetles in the family Cerambycidae, containing the following species:

 Icariotis alboscutatus Fairmaire, 1904
 Icariotis basipennis Fairmaire, 1901
 Icariotis fulvicornis Pascoe, 1888
 Icariotis limbipennis Fairmaire, 1901
 Icariotis nigrans Fairmaire, 1901
 Icariotis pallidocinctus Fairmaire, 1896
 Icariotis politicollis Fairmaire, 1905
 Icariotis pruinosus Fairmaire, 1901
 Icariotis scapularis Pascoe, 1888
 Icariotis subsulcata Fairmaire, 1893
 Icariotis tenuipes Fairmaire, 1901
 Icariotis testaceus Fairmaire, 1901
 Icariotis unicolor Pascoe, 1888

References

Dorcasominae